Cochylis is a genus of moths belonging to the subfamily Tortricinae of the family Tortricidae.

As a result of phylogenetic analysis, the species Cochylis arthuri, C. atricapitana, C. aurorana, C. avita, C. hoffmanana, C. hospes, C. temerana, and C. viscana were moved to the redefined genus Cochylichroa in 2019.

Distribution
All species are distributed in the Holarctic, Oriental and Neotropical regions.

Biology
In the Palaearctic Region, there are one or two generations annually, and overwintering occurs in the larval stage. Larvae are oligophagous and feed mainly on plants belonging to Asteraceae.

Species

Cochylis aestiva (Walsingham, 1900)
Cochylis aethoclasma Diakonoff, 1976
Cochylis amoenana Kennel, 1899
Cochylis anerista Razowski, 1984
Cochylis argentinana Razowski, 1967
Cochylis bana (Kearfott, 1907)
Cochylis bucera Razowski, 1997
Cochylis bunteana (Robinson, 1869)
Cochylis campuloclinium Brown, 2006
Cochylis carmelana (Kearfott, 1907)
Cochylis cataphracta Razowski & Wojtusiak, 2006
Cochylis caulocatax Razowski, 1984
Cochylis defessana Mann, 1861
Cochylis discana (Kearfott, 1907)
Cochylis discerta Razowski, 1970
Cochylis disputabilis (Walsingham, 1914)
Cochylis dormitoria Razowski, 1997
Cochylis dubitana (Hubner, [1796-1799])
Cochylis epilinana Duponchel, in Godart, 1842
Cochylis erromena Razowski, 1984
Cochylis eupacria Razowski, 1984
Cochylis eureta Razowski, 1984
Cochylis eutaxia Razowski, 1984
Cochylis eutheta Razowski, 1984
Cochylis exomala Razowski, 1984
Cochylis faustana (Kennel, 1919)
Cochylis fidens Razowski & Becker, 2002
Cochylis flabilis Razowski, 1993
Cochylis flaviciliana (Westwood, in Wood, 1854)
Cochylis formonana (Kearfott, 1907)
Cochylis fusca Pogue, 2001
Cochylis gunniana (Busck, 1907)
Cochylis heratana Razowski, 1967
Cochylis hollandana (Kearfott, 1907)
Cochylis hybridella (Hubner, [1810-1813])
Cochylis indica Razowski, 1968
Cochylis insipida Razowski, 1990
Cochylis laetana Razowski, 1968
Cochylis lutosa Razowski, 1967
Cochylis maiana (Kearfott, 1907)
Cochylis maestana Kennel, 1899
Cochylis methoeca Razowski & Becker, 1986
Cochylis militariana Derra, 1992
Cochylis molliculana Zeller, 1847
Cochylis morosana Kennel, 1899
Cochylis mystes Razowski, 1990
Cochylis nana (Haworth, [1811])
Cochylis obtrusa Razowski & Becker, 1983
Cochylis pallidana Zeller, 1847
Cochylis parallelana Walsingham, 1879
Cochylis philypna Razowski & Becker, 1994
Cochylis piana (Kennel, 1919)
Cochylis posterana Zeller, 1847
Cochylis potrerillana Razowski, 1999
Cochylis psychrasema (Meyrick in Caradja & Meyrick, 1937)
Cochylis ringsi Metzler, 1999
Cochylis rosaria Razowski & Becker, 1993
Cochylis roseana (Haworth, [1811])
Cochylis sagittigera Razowski & Becker, 1983
Cochylis salebrana Mann, 1862
Cochylis sannitica Trematerra, 1995
Cochylis securifera Razowski & Becker, 1983
Cochylis serrana Razowski & Becker, 2007
Cochylis sierraemaestrae Razowski & Becker, 2007
Cochylis similana Razowski, 1963
Cochylis telephora Razowski & Becker, 1994
Cochylis tephrodrypta Razowski, 1984
Cochylis torva Razowski & Becker, 1983
Cochylis transversana Walsingham, 1879
Cochylis triangula Sun & Li, 2013
Cochylis typhilinea Razowski, 1984
Cochylis virilia Pogue, 2001
Cochylis voxcana (Kearfott, 1907)
Cochylis yinyangana Metzler, 2012

See also
 List of Tortricidae genera

References

 , 2005: World catalogue of insects volume 5 Tortricidae.
  1990: Neue Tortriciden aus der Türkei. Atalanta 21 (3/4): 295–300. Abstract: .
 , 2012: The Lepidoptera of White Sands National Monument 5: Two new species of Cochylini (Lepidoptera, Tortricidae, Tortricinae). Zootaxa 3444: 51–60. Abstract: .
 , 2011: Diagnoses and remarks on genera of Tortricidae, 2: Cochylini (Lepidoptera: Tortricidae). Shilap Revista de Lepidopterologia 39 (156): 397–414.
 , 2002: Systematic and faunistic data on Neotropical Cochylini (Lepidoptera: Tortricidae), with descriptions of new species. Part.1. Acta zool. cracov. 45: 287-316  .
 , 2006: Tortricidae from Venezuela (Lepidoptera: Tortricidae). Shilap Revista de Lepidopterologia 34 (133): 35-79 
 , 2013: Cochylis Treitschke in China: one new species and five new records (Lepidoptera, Tortricidae, Cochylini). ZooKeys, 258: 85–96. Abstract and full article: .
 , 1829, Schmett. Eur. 7: 233.

External links

 tortricidae.com

 
Cochylini
Taxa named by Georg Friedrich Treitschke
Tortricidae genera